The 34th Filmfare Awards South Ceremony honouring the winners of the best of South Indian cinema in 1986 is an event held on 9 August 1987 was an event held at the Madras. The Chief guests of the function is the minister of Information Karnataka Mr. M. P. Prakash and Thikkurissy Sukumaran Nair.

Awards

Main awards

Kannada cinema

Malayalam cinema

Tamil cinema

Telugu cinema

Special awards

Awards Presentation

 Parvathamma Rajkumar (Best Film Kannada) Received Award from Shobana
 P. V. Gangadharan (Best Film Malayalam)  Received Award from Gemini Ganesan
 P. Venkateswara Rao (Best Film Telugu) Received Award from S. P. Muthuraman
 M. Saravanan (Best Film Tamil) Received Award from K. Balachander
 K. V. Jayaram (Best Director Kannada) Received Award from Seema
 Hariharan (Best Director Malayalam) Received Award from Charuhasan
 S. P. Balasubrahmanyam Receives K. Viswanath Award (Best Director Telugu) from Revathi
 Mani Ratnam (Best Director Tamil) Received Award from Balu Mahendra
 Saritha (Best Actress Kannada) Received Award from Jaya Prada
 Shari (Best Actress Malayalam) Received Award from Raghuvaran
 Lakshmi (actress) (Best Actress Telugu) Received Award from Sheela
 Raadhika (Best Actress Tamil) Received Award from Suhasini
 Raghavendra Rajkumar Receives Rajkumar Award (Best Actor Kannada) from Deepa
 Krishnam Raju (Best Actor Telugu) Received Award from Thikkurissy Sukumaran Nair
 Vijayakanth (Best Actor Tamil) Received Award from Sivakumar
 Thikkurissy Sukumaran Nair (For Outstanding Contribution to South Indian Films) Received Award from Thirunavukkarasu
 S. P. Balasubrahmanyam (For Outstanding Achievement as a Playback Singer) Received Award from M. P. Prakash

References

External links
 Official Website

Filmfare Awards South